Conman in Tokyo is a 2000 Hong Kong action comedy film directed by Ching Siu-tung and starring Louis Koo, Nick Cheung, Athena Chu and Christy Chung. The film is a sequel to the 1999 film The Conmen in Vegas in title only.

Plot
Hong Kong's gambling champion Cool (Louis Koo) was once boundlessly glorious, specializing in a card-flying stunt that reputed the gambling world. In Asia, only Japan's Tetsuo (Yasuaki Kurata) is considered a worthy opponent to Cool. Cool is bent on defeating Tetsuo to become Asia's number one. To gain this title, Cool works hard to improve his gambling skills, but was framed by his god-brother Yeung Kwong (Ben Lam), who tricks Cool's girlfriend, Karen (Athena Chu), and marries her. Cool rushes into the wedding hall and falls into Yeung's trap. Karen sees through Yeung's scheme and while protecting Cool, she gets shot and becomes a vegetable as a result. However, since Karen is legally married to Yeung, Cool is unable take her away back to Hong Kong and Cool retires from the gambling world and opens a Chinese restaurant in Japan and everyday, Cool will secretly take a look at the unconscious Karen.

Several years later, an agile triad punk named Jersy (Nick Cheung) appears in Mongkok. Jersy idolizes Cool and always wanted to become the latter's disciple. His wish is never able to come true until one day, after he won a gambling match during a tour in Japan with his girlfriend, Banana (Christy Chung). When in Japan, Jersy happens to walk into Cool's restaurant where gangsters were causing trouble. Cool and Jersy work together to get rid of the gangsters and Jersy discovers Cool's identity and they become friends.

At the same time, Tetsuo is bent on battling Cool to prove that he is Asia's number one. However, Cool, who has no intention of re-entering the gambling world, rejects Tetsuo. Desperate for Tetsuo to battle Cool to execute his scheme, Yeung hires Karen's younger twin sister (Athena Chu) from America  to lure Cool, and plans to kill them during their battle. Desperate, Cool breaks his vow and engages in a century battle against Tetsuo.

Cast
Louis Koo as Cool
Nick Cheung as Jersy
Athena Chu as Karen/ Karen's twin sister
Christy Chung as Jersy's girlfriend, Banana
Ben Lam as Yeung Kwong
Bryan Leung as Turkey
Yasuaki Kurata as Tetsuo
Joe Cheng as Joe from Causeway Bay
Wong Tin-lam as Fatty
Zuki Lee as Turkey's girlfriend
Ray Pang
Four Tse
Lee Diy-yue
Chan Siu-wah as Turkey's thug
Ho Chung-wai as Tetsuo's thug
Kam Loi-kwan as Tetsuo's thug
Lam Kwok-kit as Tetsuo's thug
So Wai-nam as Tetsuo's thug
Lee Kim-wing as Turkey's thug
Chow Mei-shing as Turkey's thug
Lui Siu-ming as Turkey's thug
Hon Ping as Thug
Tsim Siu-ling as Thug
Keung Hak-shing as Thug
Choi Hin-cheung as Thug
Chow Pok-foo as Card dealer
Ankee Leung
Prudence Kao
Ho Chi-moon
Mak Wai-cheung as Swordsman
Yu Man-kei

Reception

Critical
Andrew Saroch of Far East Films rated the film a score of 3 stars out of 5 and commented on the film's comedy as "sometimes amusing" and sometimes "crude" and calls the film "mostly entertaining." LoveHKFilm gave the film a negative review criticizing the last of originality, citing " there isn’t much here that hasn’t been done before." HKFilm.net rated the film with a score of 6.5 out of 10 and criticizes Nick Cheung's performance, the editing, but praises its production values and action sequences.

Box office
The film grossed HK$7,300,184 at the Hong Kong box office during its theatrical run from 31 August to 27 September 2000.

References

External links

Conman in Tokyo at Hong Kong Cinemagic

2000 films
2000s action comedy films
2000 martial arts films
Hong Kong action comedy films
Hong Kong martial arts films
Films about gambling
Hong Kong slapstick comedy films
2000s Cantonese-language films
Films directed by Ching Siu-tung
Films set in Hong Kong
Films shot in Hong Kong
Films set in Tokyo
Films shot in Tokyo
2000 comedy films
2000s Hong Kong films